Bobo is a nickname for:

 Bobo Baldé (born 1975), Guinean footballer
 Bobo Barnett (1903-1985), American circus clown known as "Bobo the Clown"
 Bobo Bergström (born 1964), Swedish chef and restaurateur
 Eric "Bobo" Correa (born 1968), percussionist performing with Cypress Hill, Cultura Londres Proyecto, Sol Invicto, and the Beastie Boys
 Bobo Craxi (born 1964), Italian politician
 Bobo Faulkner (1941–2014), British model and television presenter in Australia
 Bobo Holloman (1923–1987), American Major League Baseball pitcher
 Bobo Jenkins (1916–1984), American blues guitarist, singer and songwriter
 Bobo Leonard, Negro league baseball player
 Bobo Lewis (1926–1998), American actress
 Bobo Newsom (1907–1962), American Major League Baseball pitcher
 Bobo Olson (1928–2002), American boxer and world middleweight champion
 Bobo Osborne (1935–2011), American Major League Baseball player
 Charles "Bobo" Shaw (born 1947), American free jazz drummer
 Bobô (footballer, born 1985), Brazilian footballer Deivson Rogério da Silva
 José Claudeon dos Santos (born 1982), known as Bobô, Brazilian footballer
 Raimundo Nonato Tavares da Silva (born 1962), known as Bobô, Brazilian footballer
 Bobo Stenson (born 1944), Swedish jazz pianist
 Emmett Till (1941–1955), an African-American whose murder energized the American civil rights movement
 Christian Vieri (born 1973), Italian footballer
 Uncle Bobo, a nickname for impresario and rock concert promoter Bill Graham (1931–1991)

See also 

 
 

Lists of people by nickname